"Get Your Fight On" is a promotional single released by the British electronic band The Prodigy. It was released on 26 March 2015 for their album The Day Is My Enemy.

Track listing

Official versions
"Get Your Fight On" (Live At Alexandra Palace 2015) (3:49)
"Get Your Fight On" (Re Eq) (3:44)

References

The Prodigy songs
2015 singles
Songs written by Liam Howlett
2015 songs
Cooking Vinyl singles
Songs written by Nick Halkes
Songs written by Maxim Reality